Porto Martins is a civil parish in the municipality of Praia da Vitória, on the island of Terceira in the Portuguese Azores. The population in 2011 was 1,001, in an area of 3.43 km².

History 
Porto Martins was deannexed from the neighbouring parish of Cabo da Praia on 9 May 2001.

The parish owes a lot to the philanthropy of José Coelho Pamplona, 1st Viscount of Porto Martim, a native of the parish, who donated funds towards the construction of the parochial church, expanding the older Chapel of Santa Margarida, the primary school, in addition to the primitive system of fountains, which supported the local population. The Viscount was an illustrious figure in the Portuguese community in São Paulo.

Geography
Porto Martins landscape is varied, characterized by rock-covered vineyards and orchards, particularly olive fields, which are uncharacteristic of the humid climate. The parish contains the localities Ponta da Maria, Ponta Negra, Porto do São Fernando, Porto Martins, Praia de Porto Martins, Nossa Senhora dos Remédios, Recanto, Santo António, Serra and Santa Margarida.

Architecture

Civic
 Chafariz do Largo Comendador Pamplona

Military
 Fort of Nossa Senhora da Nazaré
 Fort of São Bento
 Fort of São Filipe

Religious
 Parochial Church of Porto Martins
 Império of the Divino Espírito Santo

References

Gallery 

Freguesias of Praia da Vitória